András Kocsis (1978, Sümeg) is a Hungarian diplomat. Since 6 July 2016, he is the Ambassador of Hungary to the Netherlands.

Biography 
András Kocsis was born on 12 October 1978 in Sümeg, Hungary. He is married to Zsuzsanna Lendvai and they have a son and a daughter.

Career 
András Kocsis studied law at the Eötvös Loránd University of Budapest from 1997 till 2003. In the framework of the Erasmus Program, Kocsis spent one year of his studies at the law faculty of the University of Innsbruck.

In 2003, Kocsis joined the Hungarian Foreign Ministry. He worked as a legal advisor until 2005, thereafter becoming the deputy head of mission at the embassy of Hungary in Nairobi, Kenya, from 2005 till 2009.

After his posting in Kenya, Kocsis took on the position of policy officer for West Africa at the Department for Africa and the Middle East until 2010. Between 2010 and 2012, Kocsis was head of unit at the Department for International Development Cooperation and Humanitarian Assistance at the Ministry of Foreign Affairs.

He subsequently worked as head of cabinet for the deputy state secretary for EU bilateral relations, press and cultural diplomacy for a short period before becoming deputy head of mission at the embassy of Hungary in The Hague from 2012 till 2015.

Prior to his appointment as Ambassador of Hungary to the Netherlands, Kocsis served as head of cabinet to the deputy minister for European and American affairs for a few months.

Besides Hungarian, Kocsis speaks English, Dutch, French and German.

Publications 
A World To Gain – Insight into the Dutch Foreign Trade Strategy (in Hungarian)

External links 
 Personal page of András Kocsis at the Embassy of Hungary in The Hague website

1978 births
Living people
Ambassadors of Hungary to the Netherlands
People from Sümeg